"Violence of Summer (Love's Taking Over)" is a song by English new wave band Duran Duran, the first single from their sixth studio album, Liberty (1990). Having finished the 1980s with the Decade singles compilation, Duran Duran found the 1990s a new challenge, in which commercial success would initially elude them. The lukewarm public response to "Violence of Summer" would shadow the band for the next few years until 1993's "Ordinary World" returned them to chart success. The single reached number two in Italy but fared poorly in other countries, reaching number 20 in the United Kingdom and number 64 in the United States.

About the song
"Violence of Summer" lyrically contains familiar Duran Duran themes: fleeting romance in the face of sexual politics, and mars-meets-venus peculiarities between the genders. Le Bon continues to set these preoccupations into more realist scenarios, challenging himself to leave behind the opaque mysticism of the band's first five studio albums. The song was released on 23 July 1990 in the United Kingdom as a 7-inch single, a 12-inch single, a CD single, and a cassette single. Two weeks later, on 6 August, another 12-inch single featuring "Throb" as a B-side was issued.

Music video
The end of the 1980s marked a profound change in Duran Duran's video fortunes. MTV's interest had shifted to younger bands, and their format was changing in any case. VH1 was friendlier, but was more interested in the band's classic videos than in their current products. Duran Duran found it increasingly difficult to get a new video played where the public could see it.

The video for "Violence of Summer" was filmed in Paris by the young directing duo Big TV! (more conventionally known as Andy Delaney and Monty Whitebloom). The band, with paler skin and shorter hair than before, plays energetically on a set constructed to look like a bumper-car rig (mirroring the amusement park theme of the album sleeve), while models (including Tess Daly) in platinum blonde wigs hang about outside looking seductive. Newly muscular guitarist Warren Cuccurullo is almost unrecognisable to fans who were accustomed to his formerly waif-like appearance.

B-sides and remixes
Across various singles seven remixes of "Violence of Summer" were released. Initial copies of the UK 12-inch included a limited edition poster. The B-side, "Throb", is an ambient instrumental remix of Liberty album track "My Antarctica". The use of a remixed album track would be repeated with the inclusion of "Water Babies", a remix of "All Along the Water" on the "Serious" single.

Track listings

UK 7-inch and cassette single
 "Violence of Summer (Love's Taking Over)" (7-inch mix) – 3:30
 "Violence of Summer (Love's Taking Over)" (The Story mix) – 3:14

UK 12-inch single
A1. "Violence of Summer (Love's Taking Over)" (The Power mix) – 5:02
AA1. "Violence of Summer (Love's Taking Over)" – 4:19
AA2. "Violence of Summer (Love's Taking Over)" (The Story mix) – 3:14

UK remix 12-inch single
A1. "Violence of Summer (Love's Taking Over)" (The Rock mix) – 4:24
B1. "Violence of Summer (Love's Taking Over)" (The Dub (Sounds of a Powerful mix)) – 4:52
B2. "Throb" – 4:27

UK CD single
 "Violence of Summer (Love's Taking Over)" (LP version) – 4:20
 "Throb" – 4:27
 "Violence of Summer (Love's Taking Over)" (The Power Cut Down) – 4:01
 "Violence of Summer (Love's Taking Over)" (The Story mix) – 3:14

US and Canadian cassette single
 "Violence of Summer (Love's Taking Over)"
 "Yo Bad Azizi"

US 12-inch and CD single
 "Violence of Summer (Love's Taking Over)" (The Power mix) – 4:56
 "Violence of Summer (Love's Taking Over)" (dub mix) – 4:47
 "Violence of Summer (Love's Taking Over)" (rock mix) – 4:23
 "Violence of Summer (Love's Taking Over)" (The Story mix) – 3:14
 "Throb" (instrumental) – 4:25

Japanese mini-CD single
 "Violence of Summer (Love's Taking Over)" (LP version)
 "Violence of Summer (Love's Taking Over)" (The Power Cut Down)

The Singles 1986–1995 box set
 "Violence of Summer (Love's Taking Over)" (7-inch mix) – 3:30
 "Violence of Summer (Love's Taking Over)" (The Story mix) – 3:18
 "Violence of Summer (Love's Taking Over)" (The Power mix) – 4:56
 "Violence of Summer (Love's Taking Over)" (album version) – 4:20
 "Violence of Summer (Love's Taking Over)" (The Rock mix) – 4:23
 "Violence of Summer (Love's Taking Over)" (The Dub (Sounds of a Powerful mix)) – 4:45
 "Violence of Summer (Love's Taking Over)" (Power Cut Down) – 4:01
 "Throb" – 4:25

Personnel
 Simon Le Bon – vocals 
 Nick Rhodes – keyboards
 John Taylor – bass guitar
 Warren Cuccurullo – guitar
 Sterling Campbell – drums

Charts

Other appearances
Due to its lack of chart success, "Violence of Summer" has failed to appear on the compilation Greatest.
However, the music video for this song was secretly included in the DVD edition of Greatest as an easter egg, although it is intercut with some interviews to the band about the Liberty album.

Apart from the single, "Violence of Summer" has also appeared on:

Albums:
Liberty (1990)
Singles Box Set 1986-1995 (2005)

References

 TM's Duran Duran discography
 Duran Duran Collection: Violence of Summer CDs

1990 singles
1990 songs
Capitol Records singles
Duran Duran songs
EMI Records singles
Music videos directed by Big T.V.
Song recordings produced by Chris Kimsey
Songs written by John Taylor (bass guitarist)
Songs written by Nick Rhodes
Songs written by Simon Le Bon
Songs written by Sterling Campbell
Songs written by Warren Cuccurullo